Gerard Hoey is a Gaelic footballer from County Louth, Ireland. He plays with the Louth and also for his local club Geraldine's of Haggardstown located on the outskirts of Dundalk. Gereard Hoey has been a member of the Louth senior panel since 2009.

References

External links 
 

Louth inter-county Gaelic footballers
Living people
Year of birth missing (living people)